Patricia A. Haddad (born May 7, 1950 in Fall River, Massachusetts) is an American politician who represents the 5th Bristol district in the Massachusetts House of Representatives and formerly served as Speaker pro Tempore of the House.

Prior to serving in the General Court, Haddad spent 14 years as a teacher in Somerset, Massachusetts and was a member of that town's school committee from 1993 to 2001.

See also
 2019–2020 Massachusetts legislature
 2021–2022 Massachusetts legislature

References

External links

1950 births
20th-century American educators
20th-century American politicians
20th-century American women educators
20th-century American women politicians
21st-century American politicians
21st-century American women politicians
Schoolteachers from Massachusetts
Bridgewater State University alumni
Living people
Democratic Party members of the Massachusetts House of Representatives
People from Somerset, Massachusetts
Politicians from Fall River, Massachusetts
School board members in Massachusetts
Women state legislators in Massachusetts